Khadzhalmakhi (Dargwa: Хажалмахьи) is a rural locality (a selo) and the administrative centre of Khadzhalmakhinsky Selsoviet, Levashinsky District, Republic of Dagestan, Russia. The population was 6,187 as of 2010. There are 18 streets.

Geography 
Khadzhalmakhi is located 15 km southwest of Levashi (the district's administrative centre) by road. Tashkapur and Nizhny Ubekimakhi are the nearest rural localities.

Nationalities 
Dargins live there.

References 

Rural localities in Levashinsky District